Aravind Krishna Joshi (August 5, 1929 – December 31, 2017) was the Henry Salvatori Professor of Computer and Cognitive Science in the computer science department of the University of Pennsylvania. Joshi defined the tree-adjoining grammar formalism which is often used in computational linguistics and natural language processing.

Joshi studied at Pune University and the Indian Institute of Science, where he was awarded a BE in electrical engineering and a DIISc in communication engineering respectively. Joshi's graduate work was done in the electrical engineering department at the University of Pennsylvania, and he was awarded his PhD in 1960. He became a professor at Penn and was the co-founder and co-director of the Institute for Research in Cognitive Science.

Awards and recognitions
 Guggenheim fellow, 1971–72
 Fellow of the Institute of Electrical and Electronics Engineers (IEEE), 1976
 Best Paper Award at the National Conference on Artificial Intelligence, 1987
 Founding Fellow of the American Association for Artificial Intelligence (AAAI), 1990
 IJCAI Award for Research Excellence, 1997
 Fellow of the Association for Computing Machinery, 1998
 Elected to the National Academy of Engineering, 1999
 First to be awarded the Association for Computational Linguistics Lifetime Achievement Award at the 40th anniversary meeting of the ACL, 2002
 Awarded the Rumelhart Prize, 2003
 Benjamin Franklin Medal in Computer and Cognitive Science, 2005
 Doctor honoris causa of mathematical and physical sciences, Charles University in Prague, October 30, 2013
 S.-Y. Kuroda Prize of the SIG Mathematics of Language of the ACL, 2013

Awarded history
On April 21, 2005, Joshi was awarded the Franklin Institute's Benjamin Franklin Medal in Computer and Cognitive Science.  The Franklin Institute citation states that he was awarded the medal "for his fundamental contributions to our understanding of how language is represented in the mind, and for developing techniques that enable computers to process efficiently the wide range of human languages.  These advances have led to new methods for computer translation."

References

External links
 Aravind Joshi's home page
 ACL Lifetime Achievement Award
 Benjamin Franklin Award

1929 births
2017 deaths
Linguists from the United States
American people of Marathi descent
Fellows of the Association for Computing Machinery
Fellow Members of the IEEE
University of Pennsylvania faculty
Indian emigrants to the United States
Fellows of the Association for the Advancement of Artificial Intelligence
Artificial intelligence researchers
Computational linguistics researchers
American computer scientists
Indian computer scientists
American Hindus
The Benjamin Franklin Medal in Computer and Cognitive Science laureates
Indian Institute of Science alumni
Members of the United States National Academy of Engineering
Rumelhart Prize laureates
Scientists from Pune
American academics of Indian descent
20th-century Indian mathematicians
Fellows of the Cognitive Science Society
Fellows of the Association for Computational Linguistics
Natural language processing researchers